Cauchas tridesma is a moth of the Adelidae family. It is found in Russia and Turkey.

The wingspan is 6–7 mm.

References

Moths described in 1912
Adelidae
Moths of Asia